Sanjoy Chowdhury is an Indian film score composer. He debuted in 1998, by composing the background score of the Malayalam movie, Ennu Swantham Janakikutty. Shortly afterwards, filmmaker John Matthew Matthan roped him in to compose the background score of his Aamir Khan starrer, Sarfarosh. He has specialized as a background music composer and has composed the background score in many films. He is the son of Indian film composer, Salil Chowdhury.

Filmography

Background Score Composer

Awards and nominations

References

Indian film score composers
Living people
Year of birth missing (living people)